William Addison Ward (November 3, 1909 – February 1987) was an American baseball center fielder in the Negro leagues. He played with the Bacharach Giants in 1932 and the Brooklyn Eagles and Philadelphia Stars in 1935.

References

External links
 and Baseball-Reference Black Baseball stats and Seamheads

1909 births
1987 deaths
Baseball players from New Jersey
Baseball outfielders
Bacharach Giants players
Brooklyn Eagles players
Philadelphia Stars players
Sportspeople from Atlantic City, New Jersey
20th-century African-American sportspeople